The 2022 season was Seattle Sounders FC's 14th in Major League Soccer (MLS), the top flight of American club soccer. It was the 39th season played by a professional team bearing the Sounders name. The team was under the management of Brian Schmetzer in his sixth full MLS season as head coach of the Sounders.

In early May, the Sounders won the CONCACAF Champions League title after defeating UNAM of the Liga MX 5–2 in aggregate scoring, becoming the first team in Major League Soccer to win the CONCACAF Champions League. The season ended with the team missing the MLS Cup Playoffs for the first time in the league, snapping a 13-year streak that was the longest active streak in MLS history. The Sounders last missed the playoffs in 2006 as a second-division club in the USL First Division.

Roster

Coaching staff

Transfers

For transfers in, dates listed are when Sounders FC officially signed the players to the roster. Transactions where only the rights to the players are acquired are not listed. For transfers out, dates listed are when Sounders FC officially removed the players from its roster, not when they signed with another club. If a player later signed with another club, his new club will be noted, but the date listed here remains the one when he was officially removed from Sounders FC roster.

In

Draft picks

Draft picks are not automatically signed to the team roster. Only those who are signed to a contract will be listed as transfers in. Only trades involving draft picks and executed after the start of 2022 MLS SuperDraft will be listed in the notes.

Out

Competitions

Preseason 
The Seattle Sounders announced the their pre-season schedule on January 22, 2022. Seattle competed against its rival, the Portland Timbers, in a friendly match in Tuscan as part of the Desert Showcase which was hosted by FC Tucson. The club also participated in the Coachella Valley Invitational with its host, LA Galaxy.

Major League Soccer

League tables

Western Conference

Overall

Results

Match Results

MLS Regular Season 

The MLS schedule was released on December 15, 2021. Several matches were later rescheduled to accommodate CONCACAF Champions League fixtures.

U.S. Open Cup 
The Sounders entered the 2022 U.S. Open Cup in the Round of 32 on May 11, 2022, by virtue of finishing second in the 2021 Western Conference. The draw occurred on April 22, 2022.

CONCACAF Champions League 

The Sounders qualified to the round of 16 of the 2022 CONCACAF Champions League by virtue of their second-place finish in the 2021 Western Conference. The round of 16 draw occurred on December 15.

Round of 16

Quarter-finals

Semi-finals

Final

Statistics 

|-
! colspan=14 style=background:#dcdcdc; text-align:center| Goalkeepers

|-
! colspan=14 style=background:#dcdcdc; text-align:center| Defenders

|-
! colspan=14 style=background:#dcdcdc; text-align:center| Midfielders

|-
! colspan=14 style=background:#dcdcdc; text-align:center| Forwards

|-
! colspan=14 style=background:#dcdcdc; text-align:center| Players transferred/loaned out during the season

|}

Top scorers 
{| class="wikitable" style="font-size: 95%; text-align: center;"
|-
!width=30|Rank
!width=30|Position
!width=30|Number
!width=175|Name
!width=75|
!width=75|
!width=75|
!width=75|
!width=75|Total
|-
|rowspan="2"|1
|FW
|9
|align="left"| Raúl Ruidíaz
|9
|0
|0
|3
|12
|-
|MF
|10
|align="left"| Nicolás Lodeiro
|7
|0
|0
|5
|12
|-
|rowspan="1"|3
|FW
|13
|align="left"| Jordan Morris
|7
|0
|0
|3
|10
|-
|rowspan="1"|4
|FW
|12
|align="left"| Fredy Montero
|4
|0
|1
|3
|8
|-
|rowspan="1"|5
|MF
|7
|align="left"| Cristian Roldan
|4
|0
|0
|1
|5
|-
|rowspan="1"|6
|MF
|11
|align="left"| Albert Rusnák
|3
|0
|0
|1
|4
|-
|rowspan="1"|7
|FW
|17
|align="left"| Will Bruin
|3
|0
|0
|0
|3
|-
|rowspan="1"|8
|MF
|22
|align="left"| Kelyn Rowe
|1
|0
|0
|1
|2
|-
|rowspan="8"|9
|DF
|3
|align="left"| Xavier Arreaga
|1
|0
|0
|0
|1
|-
|MF
|6
|align="left"| João Paulo
|1
|0
|0
|0
|1
|-
|DF
|16
|align="left"| Alex Roldan
|1
|0
|0
|0
|1
|-
|MF
|99
|align="left"| Dylan Teves
|1
|0
|0
|0
|1
|-
|DF
|28
|align="left"| Yeimar Gómez Andrade
|1
|0
|0
|0
|1
|-
|DF
|5
|align="left"| Nouhou
|1
|0
|0
|0
|1
|-
|FW
|23
|align="left"| Léo Chú
|0
|0
|0
|1
|1
|-
|MF
|94
|align="left"| Jimmy Medranda
|0
|0
|1
|0
|1
|-

Top assists
{| class="wikitable" style="font-size: 95%; text-align: center;"
|-
!width=30|Rank
!width=30|Position
!width=30|Number
!width=175|Name
!width=75|
!width=75|
!width=75|
!width=75|
!width=75|Total
|-
|rowspan="1"|1
|MF
|7
|align="left"| Cristian Roldan
|1
|0
|0
|4
|5
|-
|rowspan="1"|2
|MF
|10
|align="left"| Nicolás Lodeiro
|1
|0
|0
|1
|2
|-
|rowspan="3"|3
|DF
|5
|align="left"| Nouhou
|0
|0
|0
|1
|1
|-
|MF
|11
|align="left"| Albert Rusnák
|0
|0
|0
|1
|1
|-
|DF
|16
|align="left"| Alex Roldan
|1
|0
|0
|0
|1
|-

Honors and awards

MLS Team of the Week

MLS Goal of the Week

CONCACAF Champions League Best XI

References 

2022
2022 in sports in Washington (state)
American soccer clubs 2022 season
2022 Major League Soccer season
2022 in Seattle
2022 CONCACAF Champions League participants seasons
2022